DZVT is the callsign of Apostolic Vicariate of San Jose in Mindoro's two stations: 

 DZVT-AM, branded as Radyo Totoo
 DZVT-FM, branded as Spirit FM